Original Gangstas is a 1996 action-gangster film filmed and set in urban Gary, Indiana starring Blaxploitation film stars such as Fred Williamson, Pam Grier, Jim Brown, and Richard Roundtree. It is the final film directed by Larry Cohen before his death in 2019, though he continued to write screenplays through 2010.

The film details the deteriorating state of an impoverished Gary neighborhood terrorized by a street gang called the Rebels. When the gang murders a local boy, it prompts the emergence of several individuals who grew up in the neighborhood: the original members of the Rebels.

Plot

The movie opens to a narration detailing the poor economic state of a gang-ridden Gary, Indiana. The narrator explains to the audience of how the city came into such a state. After the opening narrative, the scene switches to the base of operations for the Rebels, a local street gang, and a one-on-one basketball game between a Rebel gang member and a local boy named Kenny Thompson. Kenny humiliates the Rebel by winning and taking the gambled winnings as his own. After he leaves, Spyro, the current co-leader of the Rebels (opposite Damien) is under the impression that Kenny's skills are something more than "something he picked up." He instructs his lieutenant, Kayo, to exact retribution on Kenny for being hustled.

While Kenny and his friend Marcus are relaxing at a diner, Kenny decides to call his girlfriend. He enters a phone booth to make the call but is subsequently shot and killed by Kayo in a drive-by shooting.  The owners of the grocery store, Marvin Bookman and Gracie Bookman, two members of the community well-respected by both the Rebels and local citizens, feel that justice should be brought to Kenny's murderer and discloses the license plate number of the shooter's vehicle.

When the Rebels discover this, Spyro orders Kayo to dispose of the vehicle. Kayo and the Rebels then proceed to confront Marvin about his assistance to the investigators of Kenny's death. Marvin argues that Kenny was a good person and did not deserve to be shot. The co-leaders of the Rebels describe how they respected the Bookmans' store and, while others around it were robbed and ransacked, their store was left alone. The fact that Marvin would "sell them out" expresses a high amount of disrespect to the Rebels, who immediately seek revenge on Marvin. Eventually, Kayo and Bobby, with a group of fellow Rebels, attack the grocery store, resulting in the near-fatal shooting of Marvin by Bobby.

The attack on Marvin's life prompts his son, pro football coach and ex-Rebel John Bookman, to return to the impoverished Gary neighborhood to find Bobby the shooter. After seeing his father, John goes to save his father's shop and kicked all the Rebels fellows out of there. Then he goes to a local barbershop, where Kayo eventually turns up. Trouble immediately brews, and John and the gang members fight. John has the upper hand but is overpowered. Jake Trevor, another original Rebel, enters the fray and saves John. After the fight, the two converse, and it is revealed that Jake is here to bury his illegitimate son, Kenny Thompson. Jake goes to visit "Slick", who reveals to Jake that his son was killed because he hustled the Rebels. Jake is astounded and enraged that his son was killed over money.

The next day, John and Jake attend Kenny's funeral, where a distraught Laurie Thompson is reunited with her ex-husband. While talking, Laurie implores Jake to reconsider seeking vengeance upon his son's murderers, expressing her disdain by stating that he always wishes to resolve such issues by fighting, which "only makes things worse". John tells Jake that he has a meeting with the Rebels at the church that makes Jake and Laurie disappointed at him. Jake confronts Spyro at the basketball court about Kenny Thompson. After failed treaty negotiations at the church and the rising of neighborhood gang violence, the other gangs (Diablos and Rangers), have a meeting with Spyro, Damien and the Rebels about Kenny. At the party for the Rebels, John and Jake drive Spyro and Damien's car into Diablo territory and shoot at them to set up a broken truce. In retaliation, the Rebels light the community houses on fire with Molotov cocktails.

John and Jake receive help from their former gangmates in Laurie, Slick and Bubba, while Kenny's friend Marcus also joins them in their fight. They devise a plan to "lose" a trunk of weapons to the Rebels. When the gang tries to use said weapons, the guns malfunction and explode in their faces, stunning the gang. In another area, the Rebels are attempting to escape the battle, but they are stopped by a group of community members, armed with bats and other improvised weapons. Eventually, Spyro and Damien fear they may lose the fight, and escape to the old steel mill, with Jake and John set on catching them. After an intense hand-to-hand fight between Jake and Spyro, Spyro is killed. After Spyro is taken down by Jake, the leader of the Diablo and a few cohorts shoot a battered Damien, destroying the Rebel leadership.

Cast
 Fred Williamson as John Bookman
 Jim Brown as Jake Trevor
 Pam Grier as Laurie Thompson
 Paul Winfield as Reverend Dorsey
 Isabel Sanford as Gracie Bookman
 Oscar Brown Jr. as Marvin Bookman
 Richard Roundtree as "Slick"
 Ron O'Neal as Bubba
 Christopher B. Duncan as "Spyro"
 Eddie Bo Smith Jr. as Damien
 Dru Down as "Kayo"
 Kevin Watson as Bobby
 Shyheim Franklin as "Dink"
 Robert Forster as Detective Slatten
 Charles Napier as The Mayor
 Wings Hauser as Michael Casey
 Frank Pesce as Detective Watts
 Godfrey Danchimah as Marcus
 Seraiah Carol as Thelma Jones
 Dawn Stern as "Princess"
 Timothy Lewis as Kenny Thompson
 Linda Marie Bright as Lisa Bookman

Reception

The film had mixed reviews. The film holds a 53% rating on Rotten Tomatoes based on 15 reviews.

Box office
The movie debuted at the US box office at No.9.

Soundtrack

A soundtrack containing hip hop and R&B music was released on April 30, 1996 by Noo Trybe Records. It peaked at #41 on the Billboard 200 and #8 on the Top R&B/Hip-Hop Albums.

References

External links

1996 films
Blaxploitation films
American crime action films
1996 crime thriller films
American gang films
Hood films
Orion Pictures films
Films set in Indiana
Films shot in Indiana
Films shot in Chicago
Films directed by Larry Cohen
1990s English-language films
1990s American films